Martin Foncello is an American politician. He serves as a Republican member for the 107th district of the Connecticut House of Representatives.

Life and career 
Foncello attended Boston College and served in the United States Army.

In 2022, Foncello defeated Phoebe Holmes in the general election, winning 54 percent of the votes. He succeeded Stephen Harding. He assumed office in 2023.

References 

Living people
Place of birth missing (living people)
Year of birth missing (living people)
Republican Party members of the Connecticut House of Representatives
21st-century American politicians
Boston College alumni